Secale montanum, wild perennial rye, is a species in the rye genus Secale  native to the Mediterranean, the Middle East, the Caucasus region, and eastwards through Iran to Pakistan. It is a short-lived, self-fertile perennial. It is thought to be the ultimate parent of domesticated rye (Secale cereale), and crosses with S. cereale have had some success in creating fodder cultivars. Some authorities consider the synonym Secale strictum C.Presl. to have priority.

References

Pooideae
Plants described in 1825